The Minister for Enterprise and Lifelong Learning was a cabinet position in the Scottish Executive. The position was first created in the 1999 as part of the Dewar government and continued into the McLeish cabinet. Following the election of Jack McConnell as  First Minister in 2003 transportation was added to the portfolio in his first cabinet and then subsequently removed in his second. Following the election of the SNP government under Alex Salmond the responsibility of the post was divided, with Enterprise portfolio given to the Cabinet Secretary for Finance and Sustainable Growth and lifelong learning to the Cabinet Secretary for Education and Lifelong Learning.

List of office holders

See also 
List of Scottish Governments

Enterprise and Lifelong Learning
2007 disestablishments in Scotland